Ostfalia Hochschule für angewandte Wissenschaften (German for "Eastphalia University of Applied Sciences", known as  Fachhochschule Braunschweig/Wolfenbüttel until 2009), is a Fachhochschule in eastern Lower Saxony, Germany. The predecessor of the college, Staatliche Ingenieurschule Wolfenbüttel (State Engineering School Wolfenbuettel), was founded in 1928.  It merged with two other independent institutions in August 1971.

It has campuses at:
 Salzgitter (SZ)
 Wolfenbüttel (WF)
 Wolfsburg (WOB)
 Suderburg (UE)

History
The campus in Suderburg was transferred in 2009 from the University of Lüneburg to the Fachhochschule Braunschweig/Wolfenbüttel. The former campus in Braunschweig was relocated to Wolfenbüttel in 2010.

Notable people

Faculty 

 Irina Kummert, professor of human resource management.

References

External links
 Website

Universities and colleges in Lower Saxony
Educational institutions established in 1971
Education in Braunschweig
Wolfenbüttel

Universities of Applied Sciences in Germany